1º de Maio Esporte Clube, commonly known as 1º de Maio, is a Brazilian football club based in Petrolina, Pernambuco state. They competed in the Série C once.

History
The club was founded on February 23, 1985. 1º de Maio finished in the second position in the Campeonato Pernambucano Second Level in 1996, when they lost the competition to Flamengo de Arcoverde, and in 2002, when they lost the competition to Itacuruba.

Stadium
1º de Maio Esporte Clube play their home games at Estádio Paulo de Souza Coelho, nicknamed Estádio Associação Rural. The stadium has a maximum capacity of 5,000 people.

References

Football clubs in Pernambuco
Association football clubs established in 1985
1985 establishments in Brazil